William J. "Bill" Abbott (born April 25, 1962) is the President and CEO of GAC Media since 2021.  He is the former President and CEO of Crown Media Family Networks, the parent of Hallmark Channel and Hallmark Movies & Mysteries. When he became Crown Media CEO in 2009, he spearheaded the addition of scripted series for primetime, including Cedar Cove and When Calls the Heart, as well as the launch of the yearly special Kitten Bowl. Abbott has been featured in the Cablefax 100 list of top power players every year from 2009 through 2016. He also received the Diversity Partner Award from the T. Howard Foundation in 2016.

Early life and career
Abbott grew up on Long Island, New York. He received a Bachelor of Arts from the College of the Holy Cross in Worcester, Massachusetts in 1984. His early work experience includes positions as a spot buyer for the agency Nadler & Larimer in 1984-1985, a research manager for Seltel Inc. from 1985-1987, and a research manager for CBS Radio Networks in 1988. In cable television, he began work at the start of The Family Channel in 1988 and continued through its later operation as Fox Family Worldwide in various advertising sales and research positions. He was promoted to senior vice president of advertising sales for Fox Family Worldwide, and represented both Fox Family Channel and Fox Kids Network for advertising sales, working with Margaret Loesch, whom he followed to the Odyssey Network as it transitioned to Hallmark Channel.

Crown Media 
Abbott joined Crown Media Family Networks in 2000 as its executive vice president of advertising sales. There, he led the national advertising sales operations for the networks, internet services and digital network development and oversaw its offices in New York, Los Angeles, Chicago and Atlanta. In 2004, he oversaw the launch of Hallmark Movie Channel. During his tenure as EVP of advertising sales, Hallmark Channel’s annual advertising revenue increased from $10.2 million to $223 million.

As CEO 
Abbott succeeded Henry Schleiff as President and CEO of Crown Media, June 1, 2009. In his first year, Abbott made a deal with Martha Stewart to create a lifestyle block on Hallmark Channel that premiered in March 2010. The following year, Abbott launched Hallmark's "Countdown to Christmas" campaign, and in 2015 featured Mariah Carey in her directorial debut in A Christmas Melody, with 17 new original movies.

In 2012, he revived the daytime Emmy-nominated lifestyle program The Home and Family Show. Abbott also diversified and expanded the network's content to include primetime scripted series including Cedar Cove and When Calls the Heart, an honoree of the 2016 Christopher Spirit Award. Separately, he oversaw the 2014 rebranding of Hallmark Movie Channel to Hallmark Movies & Mysteries.

In January 2020, Abbott stepped down as CEO of Crown Media, a little more than a month after the network apologized for removing advertisements featuring same-sex couples from the air which were restored a few days after being removed

Great American Media 
In June 2021, Abbott became a partner with Hicks Equity Partners on GAC Media, a newly-formed media company that acquired the cable channels Great American Country and Ride TV. GAC was relaunched as GAC Family in September 2021, repositioning it as a family-oriented network with a similar format to Hallmark Channel. The network acquired the When Calls the Heart spin-off When Hope Calls, and began hiring talent associated with Hallmark Channel productions to appear in its own competing slate of made-for-TV movies (with the channel establishing "Great American Christmas" as a direct competitor to Hallmark's Countdown to Christmas lineup).

Family
He had been married more than once and has four children; his eldest daughter is from his first marriage.

References

External links

Living people
1962 births
American chief executives in the media industry
College of the Holy Cross alumni
21st-century American businesspeople